Schefflera singularis is a species of flowering plant in the family Araliaceae. It is endemic to Peninsular Malaysia.

References 

singularis
Flora of Peninsular Malaysia